James Talbot (born 24 April 1997) is an Irish association football player who plays as a goalkeeper for the League of Ireland Premier Division club Bohemians.

Youth
Talbot started his football career with Home Farm in the North Dublin suburb of Whitehall. Home Farm had previously produced a number of Republic of Ireland internationals, including Johnny Giles, Ronnie Whelan, and Richard Dunne. At the age of 15, he was signed by English club Sunderland. Between 2016 and 2018, he made a number of appearances for Sunderland's Under-23 side and in the EFL Trophy.

Club career

Darlington
In December 2017, Talbot was sent on loan to National League North side Darlington FC, in a deal intended to run until April 2018. In doing so he followed in the footsteps of fellow Sunderland academy product and goalkeeper Jordan Pickford, who spent a spell on loan with the Quakers in the 2011-12 season. Talbot was immediately installed as Darlington's number one goalkeeper, starting in six games and firmly establishing himself as a regular starter.

His time at Blackwell Meadows took a bad turn in January 2018, following a 1-1 draw away to relegation rivals Alfreton Town. With Darlington leading 1-0 in the 88th minute of the game, Talbot was penalised for punching Alfreton midfielder Tom Allan immediately after punching clear a cross, earning a red card for violent conduct. A resulting penalty was scored, leading to a 1-1 draw and keeping Darlington in the relegation zone. He lost his place in the team following the match, and was replaced as the club's primary goalkeeper by Aynsley Pears. In late February 2018, after receiving a three-match ban for the incident with Alfreton, Talbot was sent back to Sunderland.

In June 2018, Sunderland announced the release of eight players, including Talbot and former Irish international John O'Shea.

Bohemians
In November 2018, League of Ireland Premier Division outfit Bohemians announced that they had signed Talbot on a free transfer. He was signed with a view to challenging Shane Supple for the number one shirt, however, Supple was soon after forced to retire due to a persistent knee injury, making the announcement just the day after Talbot signed.

He made his debut for the Gypsies in a 1-0 home win over Finn Harps at Dalymount Park on 15 February 2019. Talbot went five games without conceding a goal, before allowing two in a 2-2 draw at home to Derry City on 8 March 2019. Throughout April 2019, Talbot's goal was breached just once, a late penalty scored by Dundalk striker Pat Hoban at Oriel Park. This run of 6 clean sheets, and Talbot's personal good form, resulted in him being named League of Ireland Player of the Month award for April. Bohs teammate Danny Mandroiu was runner-up in the award. His form for Bohemians was recognised by Republic of Ireland manager Mick McCarthy in May, when he called Talbot into the Ireland squad.

On 30 June 2019, Bohemians announced that Talbot was among seven first-team players to sign contract extensions, keeping them at the club for the 2020 season.

On 25 October, the last day of the League of Ireland season, James Talbot was named Bohemian FC Player of the Year 2019.

International career
In late May 2019, Republic of Ireland manager Mick McCarthy called Talbot into his squad for a pair of upcoming European qualifiers against Denmark and Gibraltar. While Talbot ultimately played no part in either game, he had matched the achievements of fellow League of Ireland goalkeepers Shane Supple and Gary Rogers in earning a call-up to the Ireland squad.

Career statistics

Honours

Individual
League of Ireland Player of the Month: April 2019
Bohemians Player of the Year: 2019

References

1997 births
Living people
Association football goalkeepers
Expatriate footballers in England
People from Finglas
Republic of Ireland association footballers
Republic of Ireland expatriate association footballers
Republic of Ireland youth international footballers
Association footballers from County Dublin
Sunderland A.F.C. players
Darlington F.C. players
Bohemian F.C. players
English Football League players